Ceratotherium mauritanicum is a species of fossil African rhinoceros found in the Late Pliocene to earliest Holocene of Morocco, Tunisia, and Algeria. Slightly older fossils from the Pliocene of eastern Africa were also proposed to belong to this species, but it has been considered to belong to a somewhat more primitive species, Ceratotherium efficax. A 2020 study considers C. efficax to be the same species as C. mauritanicum, however.

Evolution 
The phylogenetic position of C. mauritanicum is somewhat disputed. One model see it as to be located in a direct line of ancestry between the primitive Ceratotherium neumayri and the living white rhinoceros (Ceratotherium simum). Alternatively it was proposed to be the descendant of Ceratotherium efficax and an extinct sister taxon to C. simum.
It retained primitive characters contemporaneously to the more progressive evolution of the genus Ceratotherium in eastern and southern Africa.

Distribution 
C. mauritanicum was widely distributed across northwestern Africa during the Quaternary, and often associated with archaeological sites. Petroglyphs in northern Africa occasionally depict rhinoceri but often are too schematic to allow a distinction of the figured species. Those showing characters typical of the white rhinoceros may in fact represent C. mauritanicum instead of C. simum, which may have been very similar in external appearance in life. It vanished during the Mesolithic and currently there is no evidence that it eventually survived into the historical era.

Paleoecology 
C. mauritanicum is supposed to have had an ecology very similar to the extant C. simum. It lived in open savannah landscapes with sufficient water and vegetation, a biome that has vanished from the Maghreb since the Early Holocene. Its food was probably dominated by grass.

References

Pliocene mammals of Africa
Pleistocene mammals of Africa
Pliocene rhinoceroses
Pleistocene rhinoceroses
Fossil taxa described in 1888